Florence Duperval Guillaume is a Haitian politician who was Haiti's Minister of Public Health and Population, and was Acting Prime Minister of Haiti from 20 December 2014 to 16 January 2015.

References

Year of birth missing (living people)
Living people
Prime Ministers of Haiti
Health ministers of Haiti
Women government ministers of Haiti
Women prime ministers
21st-century Haitian politicians
21st-century Haitian women politicians